The 2022–23 season is the 145th season in the existence of Grimsby Town Football Club and the first season back in League Two since the 2020–21 season following promotion in the previous season. In addition to the league, they will also compete in the 2022–23 FA Cup, the 2022–23 EFL Cup and the 2022–23 EFL Trophy.

During the pre-season, the club sold a record number of season tickets, hitting 4,000 on 22 June 2022.

Transfers

In

Out

Loans in

Loans out

Pre-season and friendlies
On 9 June, the Mariners announced their first pre-season friendlies, at home to Lincoln City and away to North Ferriby United. A third fixture was confirmed 4 days later, against Cleethorpes Town. A trip to Alfreton Town was next to be added to the clubs pre-season schedule.

Competitions

Overall record

League Two

League table

Results summary

Results by round

Matches

On 23 June, the league fixtures were announced.

FA Cup

Grimsby were drawn at home to Plymouth Argyle in the first round, away to the winners off Curzon Ashton or Cambridge United in the second round, home to Burton Albion in the third round and away to either Luton Town or Wigan Athletic in the fourth round.

EFL Cup

The Mariners were drawn at home to Crewe Alexandra in the first round and to Nottingham Forest in the second round.

EFL Trophy

On 20 June, the initial Group stage draw was made, grouping Grimsby Town with Derby County and Mansfield Town. In the second round, The Mariners were drawn at home to Accrington Stanley.

First-team squad

 Players' ages are as of the opening day of the 2022–23 season (1 September).

References

Grimsby Town
Grimsby Town F.C. seasons